The Buckingham House is a historic house at 61 North Street in Milford, Connecticut.  With an initial construction date of 1640, it is one of the city's oldest surviving buildings, with a long history of association with early settlers of the area.  It was listed on the National Register of Historic Places in 1977.

Description and history
The Buckingham House is located on land allocated to Thomas Buckingham in 1639 in what is now a residential area north of downtown Milford on the east side of North Street at its junction with Maple Street. It is a -story timber-framed structure, with a gabled roof, central chimney, and clapboarded exterior.  The siding on the front of the house is wide sawn boards with beading, and is believed to be old if not original to the house's construction.  The front facade has an unusual configuration, with five bays on the first floor and three on the second, all in a symmetrical arrangement.  The entrance is in the center bay, framed by moulding and topped by a projecting cornice.  The interior has a number of original or older finishes, and architectural evidence of First Period building methods used to frame the structure. Modifications were made around 1725 and again after 1753 when Jehiel Bryan, a carpenter, married into the Buckingham family.

See also
List of the oldest buildings in Connecticut
National Register of Historic Places listings in New Haven County, Connecticut

References

Houses on the National Register of Historic Places in Connecticut
National Register of Historic Places in New Haven County, Connecticut
Houses completed in 1640
Buildings and structures in Milford, Connecticut